Saurabh Shukla (born 5 March 1963) is a National Award winning Indian actor, screenwriter, and film director who works in Hindi and a few Tamil and Telugu films. He is famous for his roles in Satya (1998), Nayak: The Real Hero (2001), Yuva (2004), Lage Raho Munna Bhai (2006), Barfi! (2012), Jolly LLB (2013), Kick (2014), PK (2014), Jolly LLB 2 (2017) and Raid (2018). He has also worked in a short documentary with Ruth Agnihotri and Rachael Agnihotri in Goa.

In 2014, he won the National Film Award for Best Supporting Actor for his role in Jolly LLB.

Early life
Born to Jogamaya Shukla, who was the first female tabla player of India and Shatrughan Shukla, a vocalist from Agra Gharana, Shukla's family left Gorakhpur for Delhi when he was two years old. He completed his schooling and did graduation from S.G.T.B. Khalsa College, Delhi. His professional career began in 1984 with entry into the theatre.

Career
Shukla began serious theatre in 1986 with roles in plays like A View From The Bridge (Arthur Miller), Look Back in Anger (John Osborne), Ghashiram Kotwal (Vijay Tendulkar) and Hayvadan. In 1991, he joined the NSD Repertoire Company – the professional wing of the National School of Drama – as an actor. The next year he got his first break when Shekhar Kapur, impressed with his work, created a role for him in Bandit Queen.

Shukla also did the role of Vijay Anand's sidekick Gopi in the 1994 Doordarshan crime drama Tehkikaat. The series was directed by Karan Razdan, but Kapur directed the first episode. He also wrote and acted in Zee TV's 9 Malabar Hill.

He also appeared in a recurring albeit a short role of an aamir's jasoos (chieftain's spy) in the 1990s Doordarshan TV serial Mulla Nasiruddin, which had Raghubir Yadav in the lead role. The series was based on the folklore of Mulla Nasiruddin.

Shukla is also a part of a comic theater play 2 to Tango, 3 to Jive.

Breakthrough (1998–present)
Shukla's biggest break came when he co-wrote the script for Ram Gopal Varma's 1998 cult classic Satya and played the role of gangster Kallu Mama in the film. He won the Star Screen Award for Best Screenplay alongside Anurag Kashyap.

"Why do I make realistic films, like Satya? Because that's the kind of films I like to do. Capturing reality is very difficult and challenging," he said in a 2000 interview to Rediff.com, making it clear that he prefers realism in his scripts. In the same interview he also talked about his preferred genre of film making – comedy:

In 2003, he wrote the screenplay for Calcutta Mail. He received his first award for this film, the Zee Cine Award for Best Screenplay. In 2008, he acted in his first international film, the Golden Globe and Academy Award-winning Slumdog Millionaire, as the character Constable Srinivas. In 2013, he appeared as policeman Sudhanshu Dutta	in Barfi!, a film through which director Anurag Basu and co-actor Ranbir Kapoor, he said, "revived [him] as an actor".

Filmography

Films

Web series

As writer and director

As lyricist

Awards
Shukla won the National Film Award and the Screen Award for the Best Actor in a Supporting Role for his performance in Jolly LLB.

References

External links

1963 births
Living people
Indian male film actors
Male actors from Delhi
People from Gorakhpur
Indian male television actors
Indian male stage actors
Indian male screenwriters
Hindi-language film directors
Delhi University alumni
Best Supporting Actor National Film Award winners
Screen Awards winners
Male actors in Hindi cinema
Film directors from Delhi
Screenwriters from Delhi
Hindi screenwriters